The 47th Infantry Division (47-ya Pekhotnaya Diviziya) was an infantry formation of the Russian Imperial Army.

Organization
It was part of the 16th Army Corps.
1st Brigade
185th Infantry Regiment
186th Infantry Regiment
2nd Brigade
187th Infantry Regiment
188th Infantry Regiment
47th Artillery Brigade

References

Infantry divisions of the Russian Empire
Military units and formations disestablished in 1918